John Mitchinson may refer to
 John Mitchinson (bishop) (1833–1918), English-born Bishop of Barbados
 John Mitchinson (researcher), head of research for the British TV quiz QI
 John Mitchinson (tenor) (born 1932), English operatic singer